Lifesize is a video and audio telecommunications company in the United States which provides high definition videoconferencing endpoints and accessories, touchscreen conference room phones and a cloud-based video collaboration platform.  Lifesize's headquarters is located in Austin, Texas. Its Europe, Middle East and Africa regional office is located in Munich, Germany.

History
Lifesize was founded by Craig Malloy and Michael Kenoyer in January 2003.  It operated in “stealth mode” under the name KMV Technologies from 2003 to 2005. Investors in Lifesize included Redpoint Ventures, Sutter Hill Ventures, Pinnacle Ventures, Norwest Venture Partners and Tenaya Capital. The company name change to Lifesize Communications was unveiled at the Interop trade show in Las Vegas, Nevada in May 2005.  This is also when Lifesize announced its first product, Lifesize Room, which was the first high definition video conferencing endpoint brought to market.

Malloy was a product manager at VTEL Corporation until 1996, when he left and founded ViaVideo. ViaVideo was acquired by Polycom in 1998. Malloy was the senior vice president and general manager of the Video Communication Division of Polycom through 2002, when he left to found his own high definition video telecommunications company.

In 2009, Logitech acquired Lifesize for US$405 million in cash.  Lifesize then became a division of Logitech, but continued to operate as a separate division led by Malloy.
Malloy served as the Lifesize CEO from 2003 – 2012, and resumed the role in February 2014.

Lifesize was spun out of Logitech in early 2016 and is privately owned.

In March 2020, Lifesize announced a merger with Serenova, a contact centre-as-a-service (CCaaS) provider.

In August 2020, Lifesize announced the acquisition of Kaptivo, a digital collaboration company based in Cambridge, UK.

In 2022, Trent Waterhouse was appointed as CEO.

Technology
Lifesize is a Video Conferencing and Collaboration business, based in Austin, Texas, that provides technology for face-to-face communications, including high definition videoconferencing, sometimes known as telepresence. The company brought their video communication technology to market in 2005.

Lifesize product portfolio includes high definition endpoints and accessories, NAT/firewall traversal, touchscreen conference room phones, ISDN gateways, Multipoint Control Units and management systems, as well as mobile video conferencing software and a cloud-based IaaS offering for video conferencing.  Lifesize also offers a recording and sharing service called Lifesize Cloud Amplify. In 2016, Lifesize brought huddle room systems to the market with Smartframing camera technology embedded.

See also
 Videoconferencing
 Telecollaboration
 Teleconference
 Videotelephony

References

External links
 

Companies based in Austin, Texas
Telecommunications equipment vendors
Teleconferencing
Videotelephony